Barad can refer to a number of people, places, and things. It occurs as a family name with multiple ethnic sources and meanings. It was ranked # 88,149 in popularity in the 1990 US census. Variants of the surname include: Barada, Barade, Baradi, Baradt, Barat, Bard, Brar, Beirad, Barrett, Albarado, and Al-Barad'i.
Barad is a Jewish Ashkenazic name derived from the Hebrew patronymic phrase Ben Rabi David "son of Rabbi David".Z
Barad is a Jewish Sephardic name of unknown origin.
Barada is an Arabic toponymic name, from a place name meaning cold (for example, the Barada River in Syria).

People 
A partial list of people named Barad or a variant thereof:
Jashubhai Dhanabhai Barad, member of the 14th Lok Sabha (parliament) of India.
Jill Barad, former CEO of Mattel Inc.
Karen Barad, feminist philosopher and theoretical physicist.

References 

Arabic-language surnames
Surnames
Indian surnames